Aheri Assembly constituency is one of the 288 Vidhan Sabha (legislative assembly) constituencies of Maharashtra state, western India. This constituency is located in Gadchiroli district. The delimitation of the constituency happened in 2008.

Geographical scope
The constituency comprises Aheri taluka, Mulchera taluka, Etapalli taluka, Bhamragad taluka and Sironcha taluka.

Representatives
2014: Ambrishrao Raje Satyavanrao Atram represents this constituency. He belongs to the Bharatiya Janata Party.
2019: Raje Dharmaraobaba Atram of Nationalist Congress Party

References

Assembly constituencies of Maharashtra